The 1916–17 Georgia Bulldogs basketball team represents the University of Georgia during the 1916–17 college men's basketball season. The team captain of the 1916–17 season was J.L. Morrison. The team claimed an SIAA championship.

Schedule

|-

References

Georgia Bulldogs basketball seasons
Georgia
Bulldogs
Bulldogs